The House of Tudisi was a Ragusan noble family, which produced people such as distinguished diplomat Martholus de Tudisio and merchant Give de Tudisio in the 14th century.

History 
The basis of their economy was ties with the Republic of Venice in the 14th and 15th centuries. They were among the eleven smallest houses in the 15th century. After 1808, with the French occupation and division of the Ragusan nobility into two groups, the family joined the Salamancanists, along with the Bassegli, Benessa, Bonda, Buća, Giorgi, Bona, Gradi, Ragnina and Resti, while Gondola, Palmotta, Proculo were Sorbonnists; the rest of Ragusan nobility had branches, more or less, in both groups. The family moved to Venice, as did many of the other Ragusan patrician families.

Members
Martholus de Tudisio (fl. 1356–83), Ragusan diplomat to Venice
Give de Tudisio (fl. 1348–50), Ragusan merchant

Annotations

References

Sources

Ragusan noble families